Duns Castle nature reserve is a nature reserve near Duns, in the Scottish Borders area of Scotland, in the former Berwickshire.

It consists of two man-made lakes, Hen Poo and Mill Dam; apart from the wetland, there are extensive woodland areas.

Places nearby include Abbey St Bathans, Chirnside, Ednam, Fogo, Gavinton, Polwarth, Preston.

See also
List of Sites of Special Scientific Interest in Berwickshire and Roxburgh (SSSI)
List of places in the Scottish Borders
List of places in Scotland

Nature reserves in Scotland
Protected areas in the Scottish Borders